The name Rumbia has been used to name four tropical cyclones in the western north Pacific Ocean. The name was submitted by Malaysia and refers to the Sago Palm.
 Tropical Storm Rumbia (2000) (T0022, 33W, Toyang) – impacted the Philippines.
 Tropical Storm Rumbia (2006) (T0617, 20W) – a tropical storm in the Pacific that did not make landfall.
 Tropical Storm Rumbia (2013) (T1306, 06W, Gorio) – struck the Philippines, China, Hong Kong, and Macau.
 Tropical Storm Rumbia (2018) (T1818, 21W) – a weak but costly tropical storm that struck China.
Due to the extensive damage and high death toll in South China caused by the 2018 storm, the name Rumbia was retired by the ESCAP/WMO Typhoon Committee in February 2019. It was replaced with Pulasan for future seasons, which comes from Malay word pulas means (twist). Pulasan fruit is popular in Southeast Asia for its juicy and sweet taste.

Pacific typhoon set index articles